Survival of motor neuron-related-splicing factor 30 is a protein that in humans is encoded by the SMNDC1 gene.

References

Further reading

External links